Dehydroacetic acid is an organic compound which has several industrial applications. The compound is classified as a pyrone derivative. It presents as an odorless, colorless to white crystalline powder, almost insoluble in water and moderately soluble in most organic solvents.

Preparation
It is prepared by the base-catalysed dimerization of diketene. Commonly used organic bases include imidazole, DABCO, and pyridine.

Uses
Industrially, dehydroacetic acid has several uses which include the following:
 as a fungicide and bactericide. The sodium salt, sodium dehydroacetate, is often used in place of dehydroacetic acid because of its greater solubility in water. 
 as a food preservative to prevent pickle bloating in squash and strawberries. When used as a food additive, dehydroacetic acid is referred to using the International Numbering System for Food Additives or E number 265.
 as a plasticizer in synthetic resins.
 as an antienzyme in toothpastes.
 as a precursor for dimethyl-4-pyridones. The compounds are synthesized when dehydroacetic acid is exposed to aqueous solutions containing primary amines.

References

Fungicides
4-Pyrones